The Col de Jaman (1,512 m) is a mountain pass in the western Swiss Alps, connecting Montreux in the canton of Vaud to Montbovon in the canton of Fribourg. The pass itself, overlooked by the Dent de Jaman, is located within the canton of Vaud, the border with the canton of Fribourg running one kilometre east.

The pass is connected to Les Avants by a paved road. A railway tunnel (Montreux–Oberland Bernois railway) runs below the pass.

See also
List of mountain passes in Switzerland

References

External links
Col de Jaman on Hikr

Jaman
Jaman
Mountain passes of the canton of Vaud
Rail mountain passes of Switzerland